Jani Stefanovic (born 23 May 1979) is a Swedish multi-instrumentalist that primarily plays Swedish death metal. Jani started playing around the age of 13–14 years old.

Personal life
Jani was born in Gothenburg, Sweden to a Finnish mother and a Serbian father. He moved to Helsinki, Finland in 1993 with his mom, little brother and sister. Jani lived in Finland until 2000. Jani moved back to Gothenburg, Sweden in 2000. After joining Sins of omission in 2002 he moved to Stockholm. Jani is an educated chef. Jani Stefanovic is married to fellow artist Katja Stefanovic a singer songwriter from Finland. They have one daughter.

Bands
Current
Divinefire - Drums, Guitars, Keyboards (2004–present)
Miseration - Guitar (2006-2010, 2011–present)
Essence of Sorrow - Guitar (2005–present)
Mehida - Guitar (2007–present)
The Few Against Many - Drums (2008–present)
The Weakening - Guitar (2007–present)
Solution .45 - Guitar (2008–present)

Former
Am I Blood - Drums (1999-2000)
Sins Of Omission - Drums (2002-2003)
Renascent - Drums, Vocals (2003-2005)
Crimson Moonlight - Guitars (2004-2006)
Hilastherion - Drums (session) (2007)

Discography
Renascent
Demon's Quest (2004)
Through Darkness (2005)

Divinefire
Glory Thy Name (2004) (Rivel Records)
Hero (2005) (Rivel Records)
Into a New Dimension (2006) (Rivel Records)
Farewell (2008) (Rivel Records)
Eye Of The Storm (2011) (Liljegren Records)

Miseration
Your Demons - Their Angels (2007) (Rivel Records)
The Mirroring Shadow (2009) (Lifeforce Records)
Tragedy Has Spoken (2012) (Lifeforce Records)

Crimson Moonlight
 Veil of Remembrance (2004) (Rivel Records)

Mehida
 Blood & Water (2007)
 The Eminent Storm (2009)

The Few Against Many
SOT (2009) (Pulverised Records)

Solution .45
For Aeons Past (2010) (AFM Records)
 Nightmares in the Waking State: Part I (2015)
 Nightmares in the Waking State: Part II (2016)

Production
 Glory Thy Name by Divinefire (2004)
 Hero by Divinefire (2005)
 Through Darkness by Renascent (2005)
 Into a New Dimension by Divinefire (2006)
 Reflections of the Obscure by Essence of Sorrow (2006)
 Invisible by Random Eyes (2008)
 The Light by ReinXeed (2008)
 Farewell by Divinefire (2008)
 The Mirroring Shadow by Miseration (2009)
 For Aeons Past by Solution .45 (2010)
 Eye of the Storm by Divinefire (2011)
 Tragedy Has Spoken by Miseration (2012)
 Incarnate by Pantokrator (2014)
 In the Shadow of the Inverted Cross by Sorcerer (2015)
 Black EP by Sorcerer (2015)
 Malevolent Creature of Kings by The Malice (2016)
 The Avowal of the Centurion by Sacrificium (2019)
 The Unholy Communion by The Malice (2019)
 "Crossroads" by Pantokrator (2020)

References

External links
 Facebook

1979 births
Living people
Swedish drummers
Swedish guitarists
Male guitarists
Swedish heavy metal musicians
Musicians from Gothenburg
Swedish people of Finnish descent
Swedish people of Serbian descent
21st-century guitarists
21st-century drummers
21st-century Swedish male musicians
Mehida members
Miseration members
Solution .45 members